The Japan Amateur Radio League (JARL) (in Japanese, 日本アマチュア無線連盟) is a national non-profit organization for amateur radio enthusiasts in Japan.   JARL was founded in 1926 by Japanese radio communication enthusiasts whose stated aim was to promote the development and utilization of radio wave technology as a medium.  JARL says its current membership comprises the largest number of radio stations in the world, and credits its growth to "the devoted efforts of pioneering hams, who took the history of amateur radio to heart and guided it through the changing and challenging winds of technology and radio regulations".  JARL is the national member society representing Japan in the International Amateur Radio Union.

See also 
International Amateur Radio Union
Ministry of Internal Affairs and Communications (MIC)
Amateur radio call signs of Japan

References 

Japan
Organizations established in 1926
1926 establishments in Japan
Radio in Japan
Organizations based in Tokyo
Clubs and societies in Japan